Althea Prince (born 1945) is a Black Canadian author, editor and professor. Her novels and non-fiction essays are known for exploring themes of love, identity, the impact of migration, and finding a sense of belonging in Canada. She is the sister of Ralph Prince and five others

Born in Antigua, Dr. Althea Prince has resided in Canada since the 1960s. She has taught Sociology, first at York University and also at the University of Toronto. Currently, she teaches Caribbean Studies at The G. Raymond Chang School of Continuing Education at Ryerson University. In 2011, she won the Kay Livingston Award from Ryerson University for excellence in teaching and mentoring students.

Awards
In 2012 she was shortlisted as one of Canadian Immigrants Top 25 immigrants. From 2002 to 2005, Dr. Prince was Managing Editor of the publishing company Canadian Scholars' Press & Women's Press.

She has been described as "a stellar African Canadian intellectual and writer" by reviewers. Her literary awards include: The Children's Book Centre "Choice" Award for her children's book How the Star Fish Got to the Sea. In 2007, she was recognized by the Government of Antigua and was awarded the Antigua and Barbuda International Writers' Festival First Annual Award for Literary Excellence for services to the arts and literature.

In 2014, the Canadian arts body the Harbourfront Centre named Prince as a "Canadian Literary Pioneer".

Politics and community organizing

An author who is active in the community with organizations, Prince is currently listed in the Who's Who in Black Canada. As a community activist, she has received awards from the Ontario Arts Council to work with local women's organizations conducting life writing workshops with immigrant women and girls to bring their voices into mainstream literature. She has edited two anthologies of work Beyond the Journey (2013) and ReImaging the Sky (2012). Prince has commented on the importance of bringing newcomer voices into the Canadian lexicon through teaching life writing and publishing diverse newcomer authors: "It is important for them to find their voice within....Immigrants' confidence is shaken when moving to a new place. The voice within the writing helps them feel acknowledged."

Dr. Prince has commented on issues of cultural identity on the CBC, exploring issues of anti-discrimination, and the politics of Black women's hair. She has listed some of her favorite authors, including The New Yorker's Malcolm Malcolm Gladwell and children's author Itah Sadu.

Critical reception
Canadian literary critics have lauded her fiction for writing "with such sensuality and grace that it creates a heady spell, drawing the reader into the center of the story", but January Magazine has also critiqued her work for having so many competing literary themes that her novels "lack a true magnetic center".<ref>Review by Margaret Gunning (2001), "Almost Wonderful", January Magazine.</ref> The Canadian literary magazine Quill & Quire called her writing style "a mixture of polemic and memoir – that makes Prince's essays provocative and politically engaging - is not suited to fiction".

However, other critics have compared her academic essays to her contemporaries bell hooks and Audre Lorde, noting "Prince references histories that are too often eclipsed or erased in accounts of African Canadians in the big city." Her essays on anti-racism, gender and oppression, which were collected in the book "Being Black" are reminiscent of Audre Lorde's often cited "The Master's Tools Will Never Dismantle the Master's House". This body of scholarship has supported the development of third-wave feminism in Canada and in the academy.

In her 2001 academic text for women's studies, Feminisms and Womanisms: A Women's Studies Reader, Prince collaborated with both second wave and third wave feminists to capture the ongoing debates around intersections of gender, class, sexual orientation, immigration and race. Featured authors included Simone de Beauvoir, Betty Friedan, Margaret Cho, Angela Davis and Vandana Shiva.

One reviewer writes about Prince's essay "Racism Revisited": "Prince describes first-hand the racism she experienced while viewing an apartment. After showing Prince the apartment, the landlady explained that Prince would be unable to rent the apartment because she would be forced to share a bedroom with a white tenant. Prince did not mind this, but as she spoke further with the landlady, she realized that her level of comfort was not the issue in question. Prince recalls: "It finally penetrated my conscious that I was being told that my skin color made me an undesirable person' (29). With this essay, Prince delivers a strong message as she learns that her skin color matters more to others than it does to herself."

Works

Edited anthologies

Beyond The Journey (2013);
In the Black (2012);
The Politics of Black Women's Hair (2009);
Althea Prince, et al.. Feminisms and Womanisms: A Women's Studies Reader (2001). Canadian Scholars' Press.

Fiction

Ladies of the Night (2005);Loving This Man (2001);

Non-fiction

Being Black (2001);

Children's literatureHow the Star Fish Got to the SeaHow the East Pond Got Its Flowers'' (under name Althea Trotman).

References

1945 births
Black Canadian writers
Living people
Black Canadian women